The Cathedral of Our Lady of Fatima or just Chaldean Catholic Cathedral in Cairo is a religious building that is affiliated with the Catholic Church and is located in the city of Cairo, the capital of the African country of Egypt.

It is a temple that follows the Chaldean Catholic or Eastern Assyrian Rite in full communion with the Pope in Rome. It functions as the main church of the Diocese or Chaldean Eparchy of Cairo (Eparchia Cahirensis Chaldaeorum) which was elevated to its current status in 1980 by Pope John Paul II.

Currently seat vacant since 1993 is also a Catholic basilica by decision of the Holy See.

References

Assyrian Egyptian
Basilica churches in Egypt
Cathedrals in Cairo
Eastern Catholic cathedrals in Egypt
Churches in Egypt 
Cathedrals in Egypt 
Chaldean Catholic 
Chaldean Catholic cathedrals